Anchioleucopis is a genus of flies belonging to the family Chamaemyiidae.

Species:
 Anchioleucopis macalpinei Tanasijtshuk, 2001

References

Chamaemyiidae